Sophia Smith may refer to:

Sophia Smith (Smith College) (1796–1870), founder of Smith College
Sophia Smith (footballer, born 1978) (born 1978), American-Greek footballer
Sophia Smith (soccer, born 2000) (born 2000), American soccer player
Sophia Smith Collection, repository of manuscripts, photographs, periodicals and other primary sources in women's history